Novo Selo (Turkish Yeniköy, Greek Neochòrion, Νεοχώριον) is a municipality in eastern North Macedonia. Novo Selo is also the name of the village where the municipal seat is found.  Novo Selo means "New Village" in Macedonian. Novo Selo Municipality is part of the Southeastern statistical region.

Demographics
According to the last national census from 2021, this municipality has 6,972 inhabitants. Ethnic groups in the municipality include:

Inhabited places
Novo Selo (seat)
Badilen
Bajkovo
Barbarevo
Borisovo
Draževo
Kolešino
Mokrievo
Mokrino
Novo Konjarevo
Samoilovo
Smolari
Staro Konjarevo
Stinik
Sušica
Zubovo

History
The fertile soil, mild temperate climate and abundance of water and forest have offered favourable conditions for food and settlement of people since the ancient times. According to the historic evidence, it is believed that ever since the 5th century B.C. this region was inhabited by the Tracian (Peon) Tribes, and from their name, the region itself was called Paeonia.  During these centuries, at the south of Peonia, the ancient Macedonian country was founded and started the expansion to the north.  This country flourished during the reign of Philip and Alexander the Great.

In the period from the 5th to 7th centuries, the region was inhabited by the Macedonian Slavs from the Strumjani Tribe. They were frequently attacked by other aggressor tribes, and as a result of the continuous attacks, Novo Selo was often forced to change its location. The first name of the settlement that can be found is “Volčji Dol,” after which the name “Selište” followed. It was named Yeniköy during Ottoman rule.

Towards the end of the 17th century and the beginning of the 18th century, during the period when the Ottoman Empire began to weaken, there was another movement to the location where Yeniköy ("New Village" for Turkish) is situated today.  During the reign of the Ottoman Empire, Manus Georgiev Turnovski and Ivan Iliev Ajdinski were famous leaders from Novo Selo.

On 6 April 1941, at the time of the Second World War, Novo Selo was conquered by the German Army.  According to the agreement of alliance that Germany had with Bulgaria, Novo Selo was under the occupation of the Bulgarian Army.  The Macedonian people, including the people who lived in the settlements surrounding Novo Selo, unsatisfied with the occupation by the Fascist counties, initiated war activities against them.

During the February Expedition, the partisan troops, led by Mihajlo Apostoloski, crossed the Ograzden Mountain, collided with the German Army in the “Kitka” locality, and succeeded in breaking through the enclosure.  Then they proceeded through the village of Novo Konjarevo and the Belasica Mountain.  On 10 September 1944 the Bulgarian Army left Novo Selo.

Tourist attractions

Koleshino Waterfall

Smolare Waterfall

A pedestrian path was constructed in May 2003 to make the waterfall accessible to visitors. Along the whole length of the path there is a wooden fence built from the local materials.

Mokrino Springs

Clear mountain water springs from the roots of the hundred-year-old trees at a capacity of sixty litres a second.

Crveno Pole or Red Field

On a plateau in the center of Red Field, there is a dispersed settlement. On the field of a few hectares there are found a few objects revealing the life and local economy of the ancient residents. The Belogasica River divides the settlement into two parts, the northern part named Janina Cheshma, (“Jane’s Tap”) and the southern part named Papri. The tap was used from the 1st to 3rd centuries. Papri has two archeological objects. The first object is located on the southern part of the settlement. It is the remains of a foundation from a building that was constructed on a rock shelf. The foundation was made with stone and earth. The outdoor site surrounding the foundation has the remains of additional walls. The second object was built from stone and mud walls, using the construction technique “opus incertum.”  Both objects were built on the rock and they follow the curve of the rock to the south. They are anchored in the rock, and therefore they are very stable.

Southeast of the settlement is the location of Gradishte.  On the top of a  hill, that has steep and inaccessible cliffs, lies the remains of a “castrum,” a defensive fort to provide protection to the citizens in case of danger.  Remains of the foundation reveal the massive fortification of the structure.

A necropolis is positioned on the first hill from the southeast.  It is known by the local citizens as “Goosharova Chookarka”, which means “Lizard Hill”.  Stone crowns mark the graves on the surface of the earth.  Burial in this necropolis started in 100 A.D. and lasted until the end of the 300 A.D.  Fifty meters west of the Lizard Hill necropolis, there is the remains of another necropolis with different burial rituals, named Spasov’s Hill.  The graves here were dug in the rock and the same rock was used to entomb the sites with a stone plate.  This place was used as a necropolis starting in the 4th century.

Jane Sandanski House of Culture

The Municipality of Novo Selo hosts a cultural institution called the Jane Sandanski House of Culture.  The House of Culture has operated for twenty years and provides the community with cultural activities, along with  presentations, in the areas of painting, drama, theatre and music, literature, and education.

Festivals

St. George's Day Meetings
The St. George's Day Meetings have a tradition lasting several years, and they take place every year on May 5, one day before the great Christian festival St. George's Day, when most of the settlements from the Municipality of Novo Selo have village family feasts.

There is also a parade of national costumes and folk-dancing group competition on this day.  After the parade, the folk-dancing groups, having their own repertoire, perform in front of an audience.  Ensembles from the all over North Macedonia attend these Meetings, and in the past few years, they have become international since groups from the neighboring countries attend place as well.

The Meetings are under the patronage of the Mayor of the Municipality of Novo Selo and are organised by the Jane Sandanski House of Culture from Novo Selo.

Ilinden's Meetings
On the day of the Macedonian holiday Ilinden (August 2), the centuries-old tradition of the Ilinden Meetings take place every year.  These Meetings are organised in the village of Mokrino, situated in the heart of the Belasica Mountain under the hundred-year-old maple trees at the site of the Mokrino Springs.  On the day of the Meetings, the people, who once lived in Mokrino, come back home in order to be there for the event.  On the same day, the Council of the Village makes a sacrifice as a tribute to the Prophet St. Ilija, and the inhabitants believe that by making this sacrifice, the Prophet will protect them from evil during the whole year.

Gathering on St. Petka's Day
On the day of the Christian festival St. Petka’s Day (October 27) in the eponymous monastery in the village of Bajkovo, there is a nationwide gathering.  On this day, the monastery organises lunch for all the visitors as a tribute to St. Petka.  There are people from the whole country at this gathering who come to pay tribute to the Saint.

Meeting Under the Maple Trees
On June 6, as a tribute to the writer Vidoe Podgorec, the traditional meeting under the maple trees is organized in his birthplace, Koleshino.  A number of writers from the whole country come to the Meeting, when excerpts from the works of the author are read.  The Meeting is organized by the Grigor Prlicev Primary School from Koleshino.

References

External links
  Official website 

 
Southeastern Statistical Region
Municipalities of North Macedonia